Haring is an unincorporated community and census-designated place (CDP) in Wexford County in the U.S. state of Michigan. The population of the CDP was 335 as of the 2020 census.  Haring is located within Haring Charter Township just north of the city of Cadillac.

History
Haring was first settled as early as 1872 around a mill operated by George A. Mitchell and Johnathon Cobbs.  It later served as a railway station along Clam Lake (now known as Lake Cadillac).  The early community was known as Linden when the post office was established on December 18, 1872.  The post office and community were later renamed Haring after the township, and the post office operated until November 14, 1891.

The community of Haring was listed as a newly-organized census-designated place for the 2010 census, meaning it now has officially defined boundaries and population statistics for the first time.

Geography

Major highways
 runs south–north through the eastern portion of the community.
 is a business route that runs through Cadillac and north into Haring.

Demographics

Education
Haring is served entirely by Cadillac Area Public Schools to the south in the city of Cadillac.

References

Unincorporated communities in Wexford County, Michigan
Unincorporated communities in Michigan
Census-designated places in Wexford County, Michigan
Census-designated places in Michigan
Populated places established in 1872
1872 establishments in Michigan